Yaqut al-Musta'simi (Persian: یاقوت مستعصمی)(Arabic: ياقوت المستعصمي) (also Yakut-i Musta'simi) (died 1298) was a well-known calligrapher and secretary of the last Abbasid caliph.

Life and work 
He was probably of Greek origin in Amaseia and carried off during a raid when he was very young into slavery. Made into a eunuch, he was converted to Islam as Abu’l-Majd Jamal al-Din Yaqut, better known as Yaqut al-Musta‘simi because he served Caliph al-Musta‘sim, the last Abbasid caliph.

He was a slave in the court of al-Musta'sim and went on to become a calligrapher in the Royal Court. He spent most of his life in Baghdad. He studied with the female scholar and calligrapher, Shuhda Bint Al-‘Ibari, who was herself a student in the direct line of Ibn al-Bawwab. During the Mongol invasion of Baghdad (1258), he took refuge in the minaret of a mosque so he could finish his calligraphy practice, while the city was being ransacked. His career, however, flourished under Mongol patronage.

He refined and codified six basic calligraphic styles of the Arabic script. Naskh script was said to have been revealed and taught to the scribe in a vision. He improved on Ibn Muqla's style by replacing the straight cut reed pen with an oblique cut, which resulted in a more elegant script. He developed Yakuti, a handwriting named after him, described as a thuluth of "a particularly elegant and beautiful type."

He taught many students, both Arab and non-Arab. His most celebrated students are Ahmad b. al-Suhrawardi and Yahya al-Sufi.

He became a much-celebrated calligrapher across the Arab-speaking world. His school became the model followed by Persian and Ottoman calligraphers for centuries. In the second half of the 13th-century, he gained the honorific, quiblat al-kuttab [cynosure of the calligraphers].

His output was prolific. Although, he is said to have copied the Qur'an more than a thousand times, problems with attributing his work, may have contributed to exaggerated estimates. Other sources suggest that he produced 364 copies of the Q'ran. He was the last of the great medieval calligraphers.

References 

1298 deaths
13th-century people from the Abbasid Caliphate
Calligraphers of Arabic script
Islamic calligraphy
Calligraphers from the Abbasid Caliphate
Year of birth unknown
Muslim artists
Arab people of Greek descent
13th-century calligraphers
Greek slaves
Greek Muslims